Viktor Fyodorovich Mamatov (born 21 July 1937) is a former Soviet biathlete. At the 1968 Winter Olympics in Grenoble, he won a gold medal with the Soviet relay team. He was Flag Bearer at the 1968 Olympics.

Mamatov received another gold medal at the 1972 Winter Olympics in Sapporo.

He became World Champion in individual 20 km in 1967, and three times with the Soviet relay team, in 1969, 1970 and 1971.

Biathlon results
All results are sourced from the International Biathlon Union.

Olympic Games
2 medals (2 gold)

World Championships
6 medals (4 gold, 1 silver, 1 bronze)

*During Olympic seasons competitions are only held for those events not included in the Olympic program.

References

1937 births
Living people
People from Belovo, Kemerovo Oblast
Soviet male biathletes
Biathletes at the 1968 Winter Olympics
Biathletes at the 1972 Winter Olympics
Olympic biathletes of the Soviet Union
Medalists at the 1968 Winter Olympics
Medalists at the 1972 Winter Olympics
Olympic medalists in biathlon
Olympic gold medalists for the Soviet Union
Biathlon World Championships medalists